Oliver Oetke (born 18 August 1968) is a German beach volleyball player. Oetke represented Germany in the 2000 Summer Olympics. Oetke and his partner Andreas Scheuerpflug tied for 19th place after losing all their matches.

References

1968 births
Living people
Olympic beach volleyball players of Germany
Beach volleyball players at the 2000 Summer Olympics
German men's beach volleyball players